Sprague Carroll Leppelman (December 24, 1863 – March 24, 1943) was an American politician. He served in the South Dakota State Senate from 1889 to 1890. He also sat in the Dakota Territory Legislature from 1881 to 1882.

References

1863 births
1943 deaths
Members of the Dakota Territorial Legislature
19th-century American politicians
Republican Party South Dakota state senators
People from Potter County, South Dakota